German composer and author Elisabeth Wintzer (16 June 1863 – 12 June 1933) was born in Bad Suderode, Germany. She studied music with Carl Reinecke and Salomon Jadassohn in Leipzig, and married the artist Otto Gerlach. Wintzer led a girls' Pathfinder group (an outdoor group similar to American Girl Scouts) in Munich. She died in Bremen. After her death, Richard Wintzer (1866-1952; presumably a relative) copyrighted several songs composed by Elisabeth, which were musical settings of poems by Manfred Kyber.

N. Simrock published Wintzer's music. She also wrote a book. Her works include:

Book 

Prinz Louis Ferdinand von Preussen als mensch und musiker (Prince Louis Ferdinand from Prussia as a Person and Musician; 1915)

Chamber 

Five Miniatures for the Lute
music for flute
music for piano
music for violin
Sternenenglein tanzlied, opus 17 (Little Star Dance Song)

Theatre 

Johannisnacht (St. John's night; fairy tale)
Maria in Tann (fairy tale)

Vocal 

Als Grossmama ein Maedchen war, opus 10 (When Grandmother was a Girl; duet)
Hinterm Gartenzaun, opus 11 (Behind the Garden Fence; duet for women's voices)
Klein Maryke, opus 12 (Little Maryke; voice and piano)
Maikönigin tanzlied, opus 18 number 2 (May Queen dance song; words by Manfred Kyber, music by Elisabeth Wintzer)
Miezekatze tanze, und andere Kinderlieder für die Stössel-Laute (Kitty Dance and Other Children's Songs for the Lute; words by Ernst Hegemann, Manfred Kyber, and J.G. W. Schroder, music by Elisabeth Wintzer; 1928)
Ringlied, opus 20 number 3 (Ring Song; words by Manfred Kyber, music by Elisabeth Wintzer)
Rosen, opus 20 number 2 (Roses; words by Manfred Kyber, music by Elisabeth Wintzer)
Schneeflockenreigen, opus 19 (Snowflakes; words by Manfred Kyber, music by Elisabeth Wintzer)
Schnurrkatze, opus 20 number 1 (Mustache; words by Manfred Kyber, music by Elisabeth Wintzer)
Tanzleid der Dorfdirnen, opus 15 (Dance of the Village Maidens; duet)

References 

German women classical composers
German classical composers
1863 births
1933 deaths
German women writers